Prochlorperazine, formerly sold under the brand name Compazine among others, is a medication used to treat nausea, migraines, schizophrenia, psychosis and anxiety. It is a less preferred medication for anxiety. It may be taken by mouth, rectally, injection into a vein, or injection into a muscle.

Common side effects include sleepiness, blurry vision, low blood pressure, and dizziness. Serious side effects may include movement disorders including tardive dyskinesia and neuroleptic malignant syndrome. Use in pregnancy and breastfeeding is generally not recommended. It is a typical antipsychotic which is believed to work by reducing the action of dopamine in the brain.

Prochlorperazine was approved for medical use in the United States in 1956. It is available as a generic medication. In 2020, it was the 355th most commonly prescribed medication in the United States, with more than 600thousand prescriptions.

Medical uses

Vomiting
Prochlorperazine is used to prevent vomiting caused by chemotherapy, radiation therapy and in the pre- and postoperative setting. A 2015 Cochrane review found no differences in efficacy among drugs commonly used for this purpose in emergency rooms.

Migraine
Prochlorperazine, generally by intravenous, is used to treat migraine. Such use is recommended by The American Headache Society. A 2019 systematic review found prochlorperazine was nearly three times as likely as metoclopramide to relieve headache within 60 minutes of administration.

Labyrinthitis
In the UK prochlorperazine maleate has been used for labyrinthitis, which include not only nausea and vertigo, but spatial and temporal 'jerking' and distortion.

Side effects 
Sedation is very common, and extrapyramidal side effects are common and include restlessness, dystonic reactions, pseudoparkinsonism, and akathisia; the extrapyramidal symptoms can affect 2% of people at low doses, whereas higher doses may affect as many as 40% of people.

Prochlorperazine can also cause a life-threatening condition called neuroleptic malignant syndrome (NMS). Some symptoms of NMS include high fever, stiff muscles, neck muscle spasm, confusion, irregular pulse or blood pressure, fast heart rate (tachycardia), sweating, abnormal heart rhythms (arrhythmias). Research from the Veterans Administration and United States Food and Drug Administration show injection site reactions. Adverse effects are similar in children.

Warning 
The FDA approved label for prochlorperazine includes a warning for increased risk of mortality in elderly patients with dementia related psychosis.

Discontinuation
The British National Formulary recommends a gradual withdrawal when discontinuing antipsychotics to avoid acute withdrawal syndrome or rapid relapse. Symptoms of withdrawal commonly include nausea, vomiting, and loss of appetite. Other symptoms may include restlessness, increased sweating, and trouble sleeping. Less commonly there may be a feeling of the world spinning, numbness, or muscle pains. Symptoms generally resolve after a short period of time.

There is tentative evidence that discontinuation of antipsychotics can result in psychosis. It may also result in reoccurrence of the condition that is being treated. Rarely tardive dyskinesia can occur when the medication is stopped.

Pharmacology 

Prochlorperazine is thought to exert its antipsychotic effects by blocking dopamine receptors.

Prochlorperazine is analogous to chlorpromazine; both of these agents antagonize dopaminergic D2 receptors in various pathways of the central nervous system. This D2 blockade results in antipsychotic, antiemetic and other effects. Hyperprolactinemia is a side effect of dopamine antagonists as blockade of D2 receptors within the tuberoinfundibular pathway results in increased plasma levels of prolactin due to increased secretion by lactotrophs in the anterior pituitary.

Following intramuscular injection, the antiemetic action is evident within 5 to 10 minutes and lasts for 3 to 4 hours. Rapid action is also noted after buccal treatment. With oral dosing, the start of action is delayed but the duration somewhat longer (approximately 6 hours).

Society and culture
In the United Kingdom, prochlorperazine is available for the treatment of nausea caused by migraine as a tablet dissolved in the mouth, and in Australia as a tablet swallowed whole. In the UK, it is available via a prescription and as a pharmacy medicine, meaning it does not require a prescription but is only available after talking with a pharmacist.

Marketing
Prochlorperazine is available as tablets, suppositories, and in an injectable form.

As of September 2017 it was marketed under the trade names Ametil, Antinaus, Buccastem, Bukatel, Chlormeprazine, Chloropernazine, Compazine, Compro, Daolin, Dhaperazine, Emedrotec, Emetiral, Eminorm, Lotamin, Mitil, Mormal, Nautisol, Novamin, Novomit, Proazine, Procalm, Prochlorperazin, Prochlorperazine, Prochlorpérazine, Prochlorperazinum, Prochlozine, Proclorperazina, Promat, Promin, Promtil, Roumin, Scripto-metic, Seratil, Stemetil, Steremal, Vergon, Vestil, and Volimin.

It was also marketed at that time as a combination drug for humans with paracetamol as Vestil-A, as a combination drug for veterinary use, with isopropamide as Darbazine.

Research
Alexza Pharmaceuticals studied an inhaled form of prochlorperazine for the treatment of migraine through Phase II trials under the development name AT-001; development was discontinued in 2011.

Synthesis

The alkylation of 2-chlorophenothiazine (1) and 1-(3-Chloropropyl)-4-methylpiperazine [104-16-5] (2) in the presence of sodamide gives Prochlorperazine (3); or by alkylation of 2-Chloro-10-(3-chloropropyl)phenothiazine [2765-59-5] (4) and 1-methylpiperazine (5).

References

External links 
 

Antiemetics
Antimigraine drugs
Typical antipsychotics
Chloroarenes
GHB receptor ligands
Hepatotoxins
Phenothiazines
Piperazines
Wikipedia medicine articles ready to translate